Carolyn Floyd (born 1933) is an American educator and politician. She served as the first president of the Kodiak Community College in the U.S. state of Alaska, and was the mayor of Kodiak for 18 consecutive years. She is a 2012 Alaska Women's Hall of Fame. Floyd attended Northwest Mississippi Community College, the University of Arkansas (bachelor's degree) and the University of Mississippi (master's degree).

Awards
 “Who’s Who in International Education” (1985)
 Honorary Doctorate of Education, University of Alaska Anchorage (1989)
 Lifetime Achievement Award by the Alaska Municipal League (2003)
 Community Leaders of America Award by the Alaska Municipal League (1990)
 Certificate of Achievement in Leadership Excellence, National League of Cities (2008)
 One of six finalists for the Women in Municipal Government Award, National League of Cities (2010).

See also
 Carolyn Floyd Library

References

1933 births
Heads of universities and colleges in the United States
Date of birth missing (living people)
Educators from Alaska
American women educators
Living people
Mayors of places in Alaska
People from Kodiak, Alaska
Place of birth missing (living people)
University of Arkansas alumni
University of Mississippi alumni
Women in Alaska politics
Women mayors of places in Alaska
Women heads of universities and colleges
21st-century American women